Kate Mullany (1845–1906) was an early female labor leader who started the all-women Collar Laundry Union in Troy, New York in February 1864. It was one of the first women's unions that lasted longer than the resolution of a specific issue.

Biography
Kate Mullany was an Irish immigrant born in 1845, and she moved to the United States of America at a very young age. With her co-workers Esther Keegan and Sarah McQuillan, she organized approximately 300 women into the first sustained female union in the country, the Collar Laundry Union, in 1864. Mullany went on to be its president and was elected second vice-president of the National Labor Union.

At the age of 19, when her father died, Mullany had to work 12–14 hours a day for $3 a week. She led a successful six-day strike in 1864 with over 300 other women to increase wages and improve working conditions. The strike led to a 25-percent increase in wages.

The National Labor Union saw what Mullany was doing and they appointed her to be assistant secretary of the National Labor Union, a union of which she would later be elected the Vice President.

In 1869 she married John Fogarty and her obituary was listed under her married name. Around that time, Mullany also failed at trying to create new laundry and collar-making cooperatives. She died in 1906 and was buried in the Fogarty family plot in St. Peter's Cemetery, Troy, New York.

The Kate Mullany House, at 350 8th Street in Troy, was declared a National Historic Landmark in 1998, and became a National Historic Site in 2008.

In 2000, Mullany was inducted into the National Women's Hall of Fame. She has been honored by the New York State Senate, and her home is on the Women's Heritage Trail.

See also
 Kate Mullany House
 Collar Laundry Union
 Troy, New York
 National Women's Hall of Fame
 National Labor Union

References

External links
 The Kate Mullany story at the Public Employees Federation web site
 Connect Kids to Troy History

Further reading

1845 births
1906 deaths
19th-century Irish people
Irish emigrants to the United States (before 1923)
People from Troy, New York
Irish feminists
American feminists
American trade union leaders
Activists from New York (state)